'Small Industries Development Corporations ('SIDCO') are state-owned companies or agencies in the states of India which were established at various times under the policy of Government of India for the promotion of small scale industries.

A few of the SIDCOs are:
 Kerala Small Industries Development Corporation Limited (Kerala SIDCO)
 Small Industries Development Corporation of Jammu and Kashmir (JKSIDCO).
 Tamil Nadu Small Industries Development Corporation Limited (TANSIDCO).

References 

Small-scale industry in India
State industrial development corporations of India